Tramping music and tramping song are the styles of music and songs associated with Czech tramping recreational activity. Their sound is essentially American country music transplanted into Czech language and culture, blended with Czech folk songs. In particular, Czech bluegrass music is a significant component of the tramping style.

The style originated in the early 1900s, right after World War I, together with the tramping movement. While originally intended for singing on trail and by camp fire, concerts of tramp songs are popular both in various music venues and in private gatherings "off nature".

The CD series Nejhezčí české trampské písničky ("The Best Czech Tramping Songs") provides a selection of classic and popular songs in this style.

See also
Tourist song in Soviet Union and Russia

References

Czech music
Americana in the Czech Republic